Hyrulnizam Juma'at (born 14 November 1986) is a Singaporean footballer who plays for Albirex Niigata Singapore and the Singapore national football team. Hyrulnizam started his professional footballing career with S.League club Young Lions, and has played as a goalkeeper for the entirety of his career.

Career

SAFFC 
Hyrulnizam began his footballing career as part of the youth setup of SAFFC (now Warriors FC).

Young Lions 
He eventually chose to sign for Young Lions in 2006.

Back to SAFFC 
At the end of 2009,  Hyrulnizam rejoined his boyhood club, Warriors FC. On 23 March 2010, Hyrulnizam made his Asian Champions League debut, coming on for Shahril Jantan in the 89th minute, keeping a clean sheet as well as two saves.

LionsXII 
In 2012, he played for Malaysia Super League club LionsXII for a season before reuniting with Warriors FC once again in 2013. During his time with the LionsXII, he played second fiddle to Izwan Mahbud. He, however, grabbed his chances with both hands when Izwan was out injured, conceding only one goal in three games.

Warriors FC 
Following his departure from the LionsXII, Hyrulnizam once again joined Warriors FC, replacing the outgoing Sharil Jantan.

Tampines Rovers 
After the 2013 S.League season, Hyrulnizam signed for Tampines Rovers FC. His impressive performance during his stint with Tampines Rover FC led to him being nominated by Goal.com on 24 February 2014 as its Southeast Asia Player of the Week. Although Hyrulnizam was the first choice goalkeeper at a club for the first time in his career, he only managed a total of 19 appearances for the Stags in total due to a fibromotasis tumour on his right glute.

Home United 
After a bright spell at Tampines Rover FC, he switched clubs once again, joining rivals Home United. He was retained for the 2016 S.League season.

Re-signing for Warriors FC 
Hyrulnizam re-signed for boyhood club Warriors FC once again for the 2017 S.League season.

Career statistics

Club
.

Notes

International career
Hyrulnizam has represented Singapore's U23 side in the 2009 Southeast Asian Games, playing a total of 4 games during the competition, helping the team to a bronze medal.

On 1 June 2012, Hyrulnizam made his senior international debut for the Singapore national football team in a friendly match against Hong Kong. The match ended 1-0 in a Hong Kong victory. Following his international debut, he served as back-up to compatriots Hassan Sunny and Izwan Mahbud as the 3rd choice national goalkeeper. Hyrulnizam was called up during the 2011 AFC Asian Cup qualification in Qatar, the 2012 AFF Championship, and the 2014 FIFA World Cup qualifiers.

Personal life
Hyrulnizam is currently studying at Republic Polytechnic and has stated that Petr Čech is his sporting hero.

Honours

International
Singapore 
2012 ASEAN Football Championship: Champions 
Singapore Under-23
 2009 SEA Games: Bronze

References

External links 
 

Living people
1986 births
Singaporean footballers
Singapore international footballers
LionsXII players
Association football goalkeepers
Warriors FC players
Tampines Rovers FC players
Singapore Premier League players
Malaysia Super League players
Young Lions FC players
Southeast Asian Games bronze medalists for Singapore
Southeast Asian Games medalists in football
Competitors at the 2009 Southeast Asian Games